Death Vessel is an American neo-traditional folk band from Rhode Island, signed to Sub Pop and ATP Recordings, and headed by Joel Thibodeau. Their first album, Stay Close was released on North East Indie Records in 2005 to critical acclaim.

Biography
Born in Berlin, Germany and raised in Kennebunkport, Maine, Thibodeau moved to Boston, Massachusetts as a teenager and later to Providence, Rhode Island. From Providence he moved to Brooklyn, New York where he lived until moving back to Rhode Island in 2007. While in Providence he founded the band String Builder with his brother Alec and by early 2003 was playing as part of a duo with Erik Carlson, of Area C (formerly of the Purple Ivy Shadows), who he had met while living in Boston. Thibodeau and Carlson worked closely on the songs that would make up the band's first album, and performed together frequently during this period. A friend from his hometown, Micah Blue Smaldone, formerly of the Pinkerton Thugs and Out Cold also played with Thibodeau at this time and the two have toured as a duo as well. With Carlson (who co-wrote the song "Deep In the Horchata"), Smaldone, Todd Barneson, Brendan Skwire (of Jim and Jennie & The Pinetops), and Pete Donnelly (of The Figgs), Thibodeau began recording what would become Death Vessel's 2005 debut, Stay Close.

Stay Close was widely heralded for its solid songwriting, its musical ingenuity and for the unique quality of Thibodeau's crooning. His soprano register is exceptionally high for a male. Death Vessel has toured with Iron & Wine, Low, José González, and The Books, among others. In 2006 the band was signed to Seattle's venerated Sub Pop Records and London's ATP Recordings. Both labels gave Stay Close a wider release in their respective territories.

On 19 August 2008, Death Vessel's follow up to Stay Close, Nothing Is Precious Enough For Us, was released in the United States via Sub Pop Records.

In 2014, Death Vessel's third album, Island Intervals, was also by Sub Pop. Island Intervals was recorded in Reykjavik, Iceland by producer Alex Somers (Jónsi & Alex, Julianna Barwick). Jónsi of Sigur Rós appears on the song "Ilsa Drown".

Band members
Joel Thibodeau

Honorary and/or performing members
Erik Carlson - collaborations, guitars & noises
John Carpenter - bass & singing
Kyla Cech - violin & singing
Pete Donnelly - recording engineer/producer & many instruments
Mike Gent - drums & singing
Don Larson - banjo, guitar, ukulele
Matthew Loiacono - mandolin & singing
Matt McLaren - drums & maracas
Stephanie Rabins - fiddle, guitar & singing
Pat Rock - bass & singing
Christopher Sadlers - upright bass
Mike Savage - drums
Micah Blue Smaldone - guitars & singing
Alec Thibodeau - bass & singing
Jeffrey Underhill - drums, guitar & singing
Rachel Blumberg - drums

Guest musicians (in the studio)
Laura Baird - banjo & singing
Meg Baird - singing
Todd Barneson - guitars & singing
Freddie Berman - drums
Jennifer Black - singing
Lisa Corson - singing
Tim Harbeson - coronet & pump organ
Jesse Honig - drums
Bon Lozaga - guitar
Daneil Mazone - drums
Jason McGill - alto saxophone
Matty Muir - drums
Hansford Rowe - singing
Brendan Skwire - upright bass
Chuck Treece - drums
Jónsi - vocals

Discography

Albums
Stay Close (2005)  (North East Indie Records / ATP Recordings, Immune Records/ Sub Pop)
Nothing Is Precious Enough For Us (2008, Sub Pop)
Island Intervals (2014, Sub Pop)

References

External links
Death Vessel official page
Death Vessel page at ATP Recordings
2009 Death Vessel Interview at Bandega.com
Video for "Circa" directed by Scott Coffey

Musical groups from New York (state)
Sub Pop artists
ATP Recordings artists